On the Way (Chinese: 我在路上最爱你) (Korean: 길 위에서) is a 2014 Chinese-South Korean drama-romance film directed by Kim Poog-ki and starring Wen Zhang, Eva Huang, Ji Jin-hee and Cha Soo-yeon.

Cast
 Wen Zhang
 Eva Huang
 Ji Jin-hee
 Cha Soo-yeon

References

2014 films
Chinese romantic drama films
2010s Mandarin-language films